Underdogs (2011) is an anthology by the Australian young adult fiction writer Markus Zusak. It consists of Zusak's first three books, The Underdog (1999), Fighting Ruben Wolfe (2000) and When Dogs Cry (2001).

References

2011 anthologies
Australian anthologies
Novels set in Australia
Novels by Markus Zusak
Arthur A. Levine Books books